San Francesco is a Romanesque and Gothic-style Roman Catholic church located in the town of Civitella del Tronto, in the province of Teramo, Abruzzo, Italy.

History
This church was initially dedicated to San Ludovico; but rebuilt in 1326, under the patronage of Robert of Anjou and Fra’ Guglielmo, a member of the family of De Savola, which included the Bishop of Alba, and later archbishop of Brindisi and Benevento. After various suppressions, the adjacent Franciscan convent was closed finally in 1866.

The façade has a large rose window. The interior refurbished in Baroque style still houses a 15th-century cherry wood choir seats, with twisting columns. The nave columns retain Romanesque capitals. Much of its decoration was moved in 1924 to the church of Santa Maria dei Lumi; its former silver cross in now in the church of San Lorenzo. The monastery in 2016 houses a private restaurant and offices of the city hall.

References

14th-century Roman Catholic church buildings in Italy
Churches completed in 1326
Romanesque architecture in Abruzzo
Gothic architecture in Abruzzo
Churches in the province of Teramo